James Spencer Braude (born May 7, 1949) is a lawyer, former union official, and Boston radio and television personality.

Early life and education 
Braude, an only child, was born in Philadelphia, Pennsylvania in 1949 and raised in the Center City area.

He graduated from Central High School in Philadelphia in 1966. He went to the University of Pennsylvania for his bachelor's degree and to New York University School of Law for his Juris Doctor degree.

Personal life 
Braude has two children adopted from China.

Legal career 
He began his legal career as a legal services lawyer in the South Bronx neighborhood of New York City with housing and prisoner's rights cases. He was the founder and first president of the National Organization of Legal Services Workers (NOLSW), a UAW affiliated union which represented staff in civil legal offices for the poor in various states.

He subsequently served as the executive director of the Tax Equity Alliance for Massachusetts (TEAM), a tax reform coalition. He published the magazine Otherwise, on American politics.

Braude later served as a Cambridge, Massachusetts City Councilor.

Broadcast journalism career 
He co-hosts, with Margery Eagan of Boston Public Radio, a midday talk show on WGBH radio that airs on weekdays. The pair formerly hosted the Jim & Margery Show talk show on WTKK, before that station became a music station in January 2013.

He also hosted Broadside with Jim Braude on New England Cable News (NECN). In mid-January 2015, he announced his departure from NECN.

On January 22, 2015, he was named as the executive editor and host of WGBH News local television news and analysis program, Greater Boston, replacing long-time host Emily Rooney. He departed the program on December 15, 2022.

Awards 
Braude won a local Emmy award and an Associated Press award for his work on NECN.

References

1949 births
Living people
American talk radio hosts
Television anchors from Boston
University of Pennsylvania alumni
New York University School of Law alumni
Radio personalities from Boston
Central High School (Philadelphia) alumni